Huawei Ascend P6 (Also known as the Huawei P6) The slimmest phone of 2013 and a high-end smartphone , manufactured by Chinese technology manufacturer , Huawei Technologies, which was introduced by Huawei Technologies in March 2013 and released in june 2013.

The Ascend P6 is a world's first smartphone who uses a 5-megapixel selfie camera

Overview
Huawei's flagship model features an aluminum body with a brushed texture on the rear. The Ascend P6 is available in white, black and pink colors. It also features a silver metallic stripe on the sides similar to the Apple iPhone 4. The charger slot is located on the upper side. The power button and the 3.5mm jack are on the right side while the headset slot, which also serves as the key slot for the SD Card and SIM slot. The Ascend P6 features a protective Corning Gorilla Glass layer along with a 720p IPS-LCD Display. It features an 8 MP rear camera and a 5 MP front camera, and is powered by a Hisilicon K3V2 (Quad-Core 1.5GHz) processor with 2GB RAM.

Software 

The Ascend P6 ships with Android 4.2.2 with Huawei's Emotion UI 1.6.

Reception
Critics and fans praised the phone for its 6.18mm slim profile, display and design; however, it was panned for its poor sound quality. Customers also complained of the phone's poor cooling system.

External links
 Ascend P6 overview
 Huawei Ascend P6 - Wikipedia Persian

Android (operating system) devices
Mobile phones introduced in 2013
Discontinued smartphones
P6